Queen Bee is the third EP by Little Ghost and the final release by the band as a solo project. Luke Ford from Kill The Raveee provides guitar for two tracks on the album while Sarah Mason from Firefly plays keyboards on the title-track.

A music video was produced for "Hornets" by Step One Media.

Track listing

An EP consisting of the bands session for BBC Introducing in Shropshire was uploaded onto their official SoundCloud page. The show was recorded and broadcast on October 25, 2014. The track listing consisted of: "Apart", "Hornets", "Vampires", "Queen Bee" and a cover of "Crazy" by Gnarls Barkley. However, as of August 2015 the live EP has been removed from all of the band's official sites.

2014 EPs
Little Ghost (band) albums